Andrew Latimer (born 17 May 1949) is an English musician and composer. He is a founding member of the progressive rock band Camel and the only member who has been with them since their formation in 1971. Best known as a guitarist and singer, Latimer is a flautist and keyboardist as well.

Career

Along with partner Susan Hoover, Latimer relocated to America where they established a music production company named Camel Productions to release Camel's new studio albums: Dust and Dreams (1991), Harbour of Tears (1996), Rajaz (1999) and A Nod and a Wink (2002) as well as a host of "Official Bootlegs" on CD.  The band went on the road in 1992, 1997, 2000, 2001, and 2003. They released their first full concert DVD in 1997 titled Coming of Age which began a series of subsequent DVD releases. In mid-2006, Latimer and Hoover returned to the UK and established Camel Productions UK Ltd.

In May 2007, Hoover announced through the Camel Productions website and newsletter that Latimer had suffered from a progressive blood disorder polycythaemia vera since 1992, which had unexpectedly progressed to myelofibrosis. In November 2007, he underwent a successful bone marrow transplant and began a long road to full recovery.

In October 2013, Latimer took Camel back to centre stage. To celebrate the occasion, Camel played The Snow Goose in its entirety for the first set and dedicated it to the co-founding band members Andy Ward, Peter Bardens (deceased) and Doug Ferguson. Additionally, Camel had re-recorded the album earlier in the year. The re-recording remains faithful to the original, but includes some minor rearrangements and some extended sections. A live DVD, titled In From The Cold, was recorded at the Barbican Centre London. The Snow Goose tour had been a complete sellout and the band was asked to continue in early 2014. However, the second half of the tour featured Ton Scherpenzeel (Kayak) as keyboardist Guy Leblanc had become seriously ill, subsequently passing away on 27 April 2015.

Despite being troubled by arthritis in his hands and knees, Latimer took Camel back on the road in 2015. In 2016 they toured Japan with new keyboardist Pete Jones and in 2018 Camel toured extensively featuring their most popular recording Moonmadness. The 2018 tour culminated with the band's return to The Royal Albert Hall to a sellout crowd. The performance was video recorded for anticipated release on DVD and Blu-Ray.

Equipment
Latimer's preferred guitar is a Gibson Les Paul, but he is also known for playing Fender Stratocasters and other guitars. From the 1990s onward, he also played a Burny Super Grade, a 1980s copy of the Gibson Les Paul Model. The amplifiers he uses include Fender, Vox and Marshall.

Legacy 
Progressive rock guitarists such as Steve Rothery (Marillion), Mikael Åkerfeldt (Opeth), Bryan Josh (Mostly Autumn) and Bruce Soord (The Pineapple Thief) cite Latimer as one of their primary influences. Musician and producer Steven Wilson of Porcupine Tree is a known fan of Camel and has stated, "Andy Latimer means very much for me."

Latimer received a Lifetime Achievement award at the 2014 Progressive Music Awards.

Discography

Studio albums with Camel 
 1973 Camel 
 1974 Mirage
 1975 The Snow Goose
 1976 Moonmadness
 1977 Rain Dances
 1978 Breathless
 1979 I Can See Your House from Here
 1981 Nude
 1982 The Single Factor
 1984 Stationary Traveller
 1991 Dust and Dreams 
 1996 Harbour of Tears 
 1999 Rajaz 
 2002 A Nod and a Wink 
 2013 The Snow Goose extended re-recording of 1975

References

External links
 Andrew Latimer on MySpace

1949 births
Camel (band) members
Canterbury scene
English rock guitarists
English rock keyboardists
English male guitarists
English songwriters
Lead guitarists
Living people
People from Guildford
Progressive rock guitarists